Snigsfjorden or Sniksfjorden is a fjord in Lindesnes municipality in Agder county, Norway. The fjord heads south to the North Sea. The east side of the fjord is the mainland of Norway and the west side of the fjord is bounded by the island of Unnerøy. The two small islets of Fløyholmen and Tolleknivane are located at the mouth of the fjord. The small Navarsundet strait runs between Unnerøy island and the mainland on the west side of the fjord, connecting it to the nearby Syrdalsfjorden.

See also
 List of Norwegian fjords

References

Fjords of Agder
Lindesnes